Milgithea suramisa is a species of snout moth in the genus Milgithea. It is found in Costa Rica.

References

Moths described in 1922
Epipaschiinae